Irek Yevgenyvich Rizaev (Russian: Ирек Евгеньевич Ризаев: born October 1, 1997 in Kazan) is a Russian BMX rider. He's a regular participant in Russian as well as international BMX freestyle competitions. He's already won multiple titles and medals in his career. He's is also part of the Russian national BMX freestyle-team.

He's 2016, 2017 and 2019 Russian Champion in BMX freestyle. He's the first Russian athlete to take part [21] in the 2017 BMX Nitro World Games organized by Nitro Circus.

Biography 
Rizaev was born on October 1, 1997, in Kazan, Russia and is of Tatar descent.

He started riding BMX in 2009 at the age of 12. The first time he took part in a BMX competition was in 2010, in Kazan, when he received a prize for being the best talent. In 2011, Irek began to participate in Russian races and took part in his first official Russian BMX Championship in Krasnoyarsk. Since 2014, he participates in international competitions like Simple Session, The Bowl and others. He has an all-rounder style of riding that features a wide range of meaty tricks.

Since 2016, Irek is studying a degree in economics at the Kazan National Research Technological University (KNITU).

Personal Records 
Irek was world's first to do certain tricks on his BMX bike:

       A 360 WHIP TO BAR TO OPO WHIP

It's a 360 tail VIP to bar-spin to oppose tail VIP, which is known as the most difficult combination of tricks. During a 360-degree turn, the rider scrolls the frame around its axis, catches it, scrolls the steering wheel around its axis, and then scrolls the frame in the opposite direction. He did the trick for the first time in 2016.

        A QUINT WHIP

Five tail-wip. The rider does five revolutions of a bicycle around its axis in the air. Prior to Irek, the record of 4 tail-wips lasted about 10 years. He did the trick for the first time in 2017.

Career Highlights 

 2014 - 1st Place: XSA Backyard Jam, Krasnodar, Russia
 2015 - 2nd Place: Moscow BMX Games Vert, Moscow, Russia
 2015 - 2nd Place: The Bowl Moscow, Moscow, Russia
 2015 - 1st Place: Moscow BMX Games Vert, Moscow, Russica
 2016 - 1st Place: Moscow BMX Games Vert, Moscow, Russia
 2016 - 2nd Place: Baltic Games (Park), Gdańsk, Poland
2016 - 3rd Place: Baltic Games (Dirt), Gdańsk, Poland
 2017 - 1st Place: Urban Games, Electrogorsk, Russia
2017 - 3rd Place: UCI BMX Park World Cup, Budapest, Hungary
 2017 - 1st Place: Russian National BMX Freestyle Championship, Sochi, Russia
 2018 - 2nd Place: Simple Session – BMX Park, Tallinn, Estonia
2018 - Toyota Triple Challenge, Best Trick Winner, Glendale (Arizona), United States
 2018 - 1st Place: Munich Mash – BMX Park, Munich, Germany
 2019 - 2nd Place:  Fise UCI BMX Park World Cup, Montpellier, France
2019 -  Best trick winner -  Fise European Series, Châteauroux, France
 2019 - 2nd Place: Pannonian Challenge, Osijek, Croatia
2019 - 1st Place: Russian National BMX Freestyle Championship, Krasnodar, Russia
 2019 - 4th Place: Simple Session – BMX Park, Tallinn, Estonia
2019 - 1st Place Red Bull Uncontained - BMX Park, Nijmegen, Netherlands
2021 - 2nd place  BMX Freestyle Park European Champions - BMX Park, Moscow, Russica

References

External links 

 Irek Rizaev athlete profile
 Verified Instagram profile
 Facebook profile
 theboardr profile
 Simple Session profile
 The sand castle project
Behind the scenes: The sand castle project
Red Bull Game of bike!
Total BMX presents Irek Rizaev in 'Brotherhood'
Irek Rizaev Youtube channel
Irek Rizaev Interview

1997 births
BMX riders
Living people
Sportspeople from Kazan
Russian male cyclists
Cyclists at the 2020 Summer Olympics
Olympic cyclists of Russia
Volga Tatars
Tatar sportspeople
Tatar people of Russia